Derek Edmund Teden (19 July 1916 – ) was an English rugby union player.  He won three caps in the 1939 Home Nations Championship.  During the Second World War he served as Pilot Officer with the RAF Coastal Command, and disappeared in 1940 on an anti-invasion patrol with No. 206 Squadron RAF.  He is commemorated on the Runnymede Memorial.

References

1916 births
1940 deaths
Royal Air Force personnel killed in World War II
English rugby union players
England international rugby union players
Royal Air Force officers